The 2008 Tour de Hongrie was the 35th edition of the Tour de Hongrie cycle race and was held from 22 to 26 July 2008. The race started in Gyomaendrőd and finished in Miskolc. The race was won by Hans Bloks.

General classification

References

2008
Tour de Hongrie
Tour de Hongrie